Laytongku or Lay Tong Ku  in S'gaw Karen: Letawkho, is a Karen village on the south-western tip of Tambon Mae Chan Subdistrict of Umphang District in Thailand's Tak Province and the extreme north-western tip of Kanchanaburi Province. It is located in a valley of the Dawna Range, within the area of Thungyai Naresuan Wildlife Sanctuary and Umphang Wildlife Sanctuary. It is inhabited by an (orthodox) animist Talaku, 'S'gaw Karen', or (Telekhon) Karen Hill Tribe and is the location of the centuries long site of the principal animist shrine (sanctuary) for the Talaku (Telekhon) Karen faith.

Laytongku appeared in the news in 2017 because of an unauthorized removal of an ancient pair of elephant tusks held sacred by the villagers.

The village is located on the Thai-Myanmar border along the border of the Karen State of Burma.

References 

Populated places in Tak province
Karen people